The October 1978 Getxo attack was a mass shooting gun attack by the Basque separatist organisation ETA which occurred on 22 October in the Basque town of Getxo, a suburb of Bilbao. The attack occurred six weeks before a referendum to approve a new Spanish constitution.

The targets were a group of four civil guards who were returning from policing a football game involving Arenas Club de Getxo. After the game had finished, the civil guards were returning to their barracks, walking along Maximo Aguirre Street in the town.

Four ETA members, armed with machine guns and shotguns, who had been lying in wait behind the wall of the local Telefónica building, ambushed the civil guards, subjecting them to heavy gunfire before fleeing. Two of the civil guards were killed instantly, while the other two were seriously injured, with one of them dying in hospital four days later.

The ETA members involved escaped in two cars, driven by a further two participants in the attack. The cars were later found abandoned in the Deusto district of Bilbao. ETA claimed responsibility for the attack in a communique issued the following day. The funerals of those killed saw protests against ETA.

References

ETA (separatist group) actions
Mass shootings in Spain
Terrorist incidents in Spain
1978 murders in Spain
Terrorist incidents in Spain in 1978
1978 mass shootings in Europe